The San Marcos gambusia (Gambusia georgei) is an extinct species of gambusia from the family Poeciliidae that was found only in the San Marcos Springs of Central Texas. The fish has not been seen since 1983. The specific name of this fish honors the American ichthyologist George S. Myers (1905-1985).

Description 

The San Marcos gambusia was typically less than 1.6 inches (4 cm) in length. It had a dark body with a slight blue tint, although the median fins were lemon yellow. The scales were strongly crosshatched, and the dorsal fin had a dark stripe along its edge. The species’ exact diet is not known, but other poeciliids typically eat insect larvae and other small invertebrates. The fish were live bearing and have been known to give birth to a few dozen young at a time.

Habitat 

The San Marcos gambusia has only been identified in a 0.6-mile (1-km) stretch of the headwaters of the San Marcos River. They appeared to need clean and clear water, with little temperature variability. They apparently also preferred shallow, quiet water, along with partial shade.

Extinction 

As of 1969, the population was less than 1,000 individuals. The species was threatened by reduced spring flows and pollution, including sprayed herbicide along the river and introduced fish (Gambusia affinis) and plants (Colocasia esculenta). As no specimens have been sighted since 1983, the species is now considered extinct.

References

External links 
  San Marcos gambusia (Gambusia georgei) page from the Texas Parks and Wildlife Department

Gambusia
San Marcos, Texas
Endemic fauna of Texas
Extinct animals of the United States
Fish described in 1969
Taxa named by Clark Hubbs
Fish of North America becoming extinct since 1500
ESA endangered species
Species made extinct by human activities